Sebastian River High School is a co-educational International Baccalaureate high school in Sebastian, Florida. It opened August 1994 and is operated by the School District of Indian River County.

Campus
Its facilities include a 3000-seat sports stadium, a 1060-seat auditorium, a 1680-seat gymnasium, a state-of-the-art television studio, an aqua lab, high-tech vocational labs, a volleyball field, three practice fields, a baseball field, a softball field, eight tennis courts, four basketball courts, a wrestling room, and a cross-country track and field course. It also has 2 separate classroom buildings for the Junior Reserve Officers' Training Corps (JROTC). In 2002, a new freshman wing, the V Wing, was added, bringing the number of classrooms to over 140 and making Sebastian River High School the second largest high school in Indian River County. The V Wing, however, does contain classrooms for students in other classes. For this reason, a new Freshman Learning Center was constructed in 2010, housing mostly freshman students.

Notable alumni
 Bryan Augenstein, Major League Baseball pitcher for the Arizona Diamondbacks.
 Jennifer Welter, first Female Coach in the NFL

References

External links
 Sebastian River High School

Indian River County School District
Educational institutions established in 1994
International Baccalaureate schools in Florida
High schools in Indian River County, Florida
Public high schools in Florida
1994 establishments in Florida